Bretteville-du-Grand-Caux is a commune in the Seine-Maritime department in the Normandy region in northern France.

Geography

Heraldry

Population

Places of interest
 The remains of a feudal manorhouse, nowadays a restaurant.
 The church of Notre-Dame, with parts dating from the eleventh century.

See also
Communes of the Seine-Maritime department

References

Communes of Seine-Maritime